Frank's sign is a diagonal crease in the ear lobe extending from the tragus across the lobule to the rear edge of the auricle. The sign is named after Sanders T. Frank.

It has been hypothesised that Frank's sign is indicative of cardiovascular disease and/or diabetes. Some studies have described Frank's sign as a marker of cardiovascular disease but not linked to the severity of the condition. In contrast, other studies have rebutted any association between Frank's sign and coronary artery disease in diabetics. There have also been reported cases of Frank's sign being a predictor of cerebral infarctions. A link between Frank's sign and premature aging and the loss of dermal and vascular fibers has also been hypothesized. Some studies have focused on association between bilateral earlobe crease and coronary artery disease. It is probably prudent to consider Frank's Sign alongside other clinical markers of physiological ageing, rather than utilising it as a stand-alone sign in the identification of coronary artery disease.

Severity
Grade 3  – A deep crease across the whole of the earlobe.
Grade 2b – Creased more than halfway across the earlobe.
Grade 2a – A superficial crease across the earlobe.
Grade 1  – A small amount of wrinkling on the earlobe.

Notable individuals with Franks' sign
Dick Van Dyke
George W. Bush
Mel Gibson
Steven Spielberg

References

External links
 Further image of Frank's Sign

Medical signs